Joe Garbutt (23 September 1903 – 20 April 1971) was an  Australian rules footballer who played with St Kilda in the Victorian Football League (VFL).

Notes

External links 	

1903 births
1971 deaths
Australian rules footballers from Victoria (Australia)
Australian Rules footballers: place kick exponents
Port Melbourne Football Club players
St Kilda Football Club players